The Toronto Turkish Festival is organized by the Canadian Turkish Friendship Community (CTFC) to celebrate Turkish culture through music, exhibitions, arts, crafts, dance, shows and delicious food. Since August 2006, during the first weekend of August in downtown Toronto, at Toronto's Yonge and Dundas Square, the festival is supported and encouraged by the City of Toronto, local counselors, and appreciated by the mayor of Toronto, the local police chiefs, the Canadian business community, and Yonge & Dundas Square management.(1)

The festival is sponsored by both Turkish and international companies such as North America Energy Star (NAES) and Turkish Airlines (THY), as well as Turkish municipalities such as Fatih Municipality, Istanbul and the Çorum Municipality.(2) The first one was successfully held, as over 40,000 people participated in the festivities on August 5, 2006. David Miller, Mayor of Toronto, visited the Turkish community during the Festival.

CTFC was encouraged and advised by Miller to extend the event to a two-day festival. On the dates of 4–5 August 2007; on 2–3 August 2008, and on 1–2 August 2009; CTFC successfully organized the Turkish Festival; securing its position as a traditional annual celebration and festivity. Almost hundred thousand people from Canadian-Turkish communities and from other communities and cultures around GTA as well as from neighbouring cities, provinces and U.S states, have visited the festival.

The festival is open to the public, and the entrance is free. All funds raised from the festival have been donated to Nil Academy- Turkish School in Toronto which was opened by the Canadian Turkish Friendship Community in 2005.(5)

CTFC is devoted to the promotion of Turkish culture and language in Toronto and in Canada as a non-profit and charitable organization since its beginning in 2005. One of its objectives is to contribute to Ontario communities in terms of promoting intercultural events, and supporting educational and cultural activities open to the public.

The festival has featured demonstrations of distinctive traditional Turkish crafts, such as paper water marbling (Ebru), and carpet weaving. There are live Turkish musical performances and folk dancing, including Sufi music and dancing. The niche tasting experience during the festival includes drinking some specialty Turkish tea or coffee in our re-created traditional family room (Sark Kosesi-“Eastern Türkiye Corner”), as you sit on beautiful Turkish carpets and cushions in our tiny oasis in the heart of the city, and be taken a picture with traditional Ottoman costumes, Other highlights include displays of handcrafted linens, clothing, and carpets, decorative accessories, hand-painted ceramic plates and tiles, copper crafts, pottery, silk scarves, pillowcases, books on Turkish life, culture, cooking and travel, and CDs of traditional and other popular, Turkish rock and jazz music.(8)

Ottoman Military Band came for the first time in Toronto with 22 team members who were supported by the Municipality of Fatih, Istanbul. The visitors were entertained with four different concerts on August 1–2, 2009, as the band also walked with the Turkish community four times during the two–day-festival; marking the first Turkish parade ever in Toronto at Yonge and Dundas. This Band, which accompanied the marching Ottoman army into battles for centuries, still echoes in the sounds of drum and zurna - an oboe-like woodwind instrument - which is a part of folk culture all over Türkiye.(10)

References 
 - Canadian Turkish Friendship Community. (2010). Cultural. Toronto Turkish Festival. Retrieved from 
 - Today's Zaman, (2008).Canadians, Turks make merry at Toronto Turkish Festival. 4 August 2008. Retrieved from 
 - The Toronto Star. (2007). Turkish festival saved city from Caribana troublemaker, Retrieved from 
 - Toronto Turkish Festival, (2009). History. Retrieved from 
 - Yonge-Dundas Square, Toronto (2006). Turkish Festival 5 August 2006. Retrieved from 
 - Canadian Turkish Friendship Community. (2009). Retrieved from 
 - The Toronto Star. (2007). Nick Aveling. Newest Raptor sets city's Turks aglow Toronto community overjoyed to hear of NBA star's choice to play north of the border. 15 July 2009. Retrieved from 
 - Toronto Turkish Festival, (2010). Entertainment. Retrieved from 
 - Toronto Turkish Festival, (2010). Food. Retrieved from 
 - Toronto Turkish Festival. (2010). Press Info. Retrieved from 

Festivals in Toronto